Muslin, a cotton fabric of plain weave, was historically hand woven in the areas of Dhaka and Sonargaon in Bangladesh and exported for many centuries. The region forms the eastern part of the historic region of Bengal.

Origins 
Bengal has manufactured textiles for many centuries, as recorded in ancient hand-written and printed documents. The Periplus of the Erythraean Sea mentions Arab and Greek merchants trading between India and the Red Sea port of Aduli (in present-day Eritrea), Egypt and Ethiopia in the second century CE. Cloths including muslin were exchanged for ivory, tortoiseshell and rhinoceros-horn at that time. Muslin was traded from Barygaza – an ancient port of India located in Gujarat – to different parts of Indian subcontinent before European merchants came to India.

The Romans prized muslin highly, using bullion and gold coins to buy the material from Deccan and South India. They introduced muslin into Europe, and eventually it became very popular.
A Chinese voyager, Ma Huan, wrote about five or six varieties of fine cloths after visiting Bengal in the early fifteenth century; he mentions that Bengal muslin was highly priced in China at that time.

Mughal era

Under Mughal rule, Bengal was a center of the worldwide muslin, silk and pearl trades. During the Mughal era, the most important center of cotton production was Bengal, particularly around its capital city of Dhaka, leading to muslin being called "daka" in distant markets such as Central Asia. Bengal also exported cotton and silk textiles to markets such as Europe, Indonesia and Japan. Bengal produced more than 50% of textiles and around 80% of silks imported by the Dutch from Asia, for example.

Sixteenth century
In the early sixteenth century, a Portuguese apothecary named Tomes Pires mentioned that Bengal muslins were traded to Thailand and China.
Bengali muslin was also traded throughout the Muslim world, from the Middle East to Southeast Asia. By 1580, some Portuguese traders settled at Dhaka and Sripur, from where they started exporting muslin, cotton and silk goods to Europe and Southeast Asia.

During Ottoman rule from the sixteenth century onwards, large quantities of muslin was exported to the Middle East. Muslin turbans were favoured by the Ottomans.
In the sixteenth century, Portuguese started trading textiles from the Indian subcontinent through the Persian Gulf including high quality of muslins.  In the seventeenth century, the Portuguese trade declined.

Seventeenth century
In the early seventeenth century, British and Dutch merchants arrived at the Indian Subcontinent sailing via the Red Sea. At the same time, Armenian merchants from Iran came to the Indian subcontinent travelling on land through Qandahar and Isfahan. They traded textile goods including muslin from Bengal to Aleppo of Syria. In an official inventory of Istanbul market dated from 1640, 20 types of muslins were found and the highest value found there is 1600 silver pence. As the business expanded, European companies became interested in founding their own factories in Dhaka.  The Dutch made their factory in Dhaka in 1663, the British in 1669 and the French in 1682.

Eighteenth century
The Ostend Company came to Bengal at the beginning of the eighteenth century. They purchased textiles through agents and their own officials. When they found the business very profitable, they also made settlements in Dhaka.

Available statistics show that in 1747 the trade of Dhaka cotton goods (primarily Muslin), including local trade valued twenty-eight and a half lakh rupees.

Decline
Bengal was conquered by the British East India Company after the Battle of Plassey in 1757 and the British Bengal Presidency was founded in 1765. British colonization forced open the Bengali market to British goods, while at the same time Britain implemented protectionist policies such as bans and high tariffs that restricted imports of Bengali cotton cloth to Britain. Britain imported raw cotton from Bengal, without taxes or tariffs, for British factories, which used it to manufacture textiles, many of which were exported back to Bengal. British economic policies led to deindustrialization in Bengal. British colonization was also followed by the Great Bengal famine of 1770, which killed a third of the Bengali population.

From 1787 to 1788, Dhaka suffered from severe natural calamities - especially heavy rainfall - and famine broke out. After the disaster, more emphasis was given on agriculture to reduce the effects of the famine. Tax was revoked on the exportation of grains. So, people became more interested in agricultural works than weaving as the wages of labourers and other people working in agriculture suddenly rose.

From 1782 to 1787 the Industrial Revolution began in Britain, and fine cotton was produced locally. During British colonial rule, the muslin industry declined due to various colonial policies, which supported imports of industrially manufactured textiles from Britain. A heavy duty of 75 percent was imposed on export of cotton from Bengal. These measures ultimately led to the decline of muslin trade in Bengal.

In 1811, Bengal was still a major exporter of cotton cloth to the Americas and the Indian Ocean. However, Bengali exports declined over the course of the early 19th century, as British imports to Bengal increased, from 25% in 1811 to 93% in 1840.

Revival
Muslin sarees were woven in Bangladesh by a group of researchers under a government grant project in 2020.
The researchers  hope to launch the muslin saree in the free market. As of 9th March 2022 the thread count has reached 731.

See also
 Textile industry in Bangladesh
 History of Bengal

Notes

References

Further reading
 
 
 
 
 
 
 
 
 

Bengal Subah
Cotton industry
Cotton industry in India
Economic history of Bangladesh
Economic history of India
Economy of British India
Heritage of Bengal
History of Dhaka